Larry Hart may refer to:

Lorenz Hart (1895–1943), librettist and songwriter, also/better known as Larry Hart
Larry Hart (athlete) (born 1946), hammer thrower
Larry Hart (American football) (born 1987), formerly of Jacksonville Jaguars
Larry Hart (musician), Christian musician, Grammy Award winner and nominee

See also
Lawrence Hart (disambiguation)
Hart (surname)